Horace Smith may refer to:

Horace Smith (poet) (1779–1849), English poet and novelist
Horace Smith (inventor) (1808–1893), co-founder of Smith & Wesson
Horace B. Smith (1826–1888), U.S. Representative from New York
Horace Smith (New Brunswick politician) (1914–2001), Canadian politician
Horace H. Smith (1905–1976), American diplomat
Horace Percy Smith (1858–1928), British chartered accountant in Hong Kong
Horace Smith (Australian cricketer) (1892–1977), Australian cricketer
Dennis Smith (New Zealand cricketer) (Horace Dennis Smith, 1913–1986), New Zealand cricketer
Horace Smith (footballer) (1908–1975), footballer for Coventry City and Nottingham Forest